Memoirs is an album by pianist Paul Bley, bassist Charlie Haden and drummer Paul Motian recorded in 1990 and released on the Italian Soul Note label.

Reception
The Allmusic review by Josef Woodard awarded the album 3 stars stating "Memoirs serves as a tidy summation of Paul Bley's gifts as an individual and musical conversationalist". The Penguin Guide to Jazz said "A dream lineup that promises much and delivers royally... Tremendous stuff".

Track listing
All compositions by Paul Bley except as indicated
 "Memoirs" - 9:50 
 "Monk's Dream" (Thelonious Monk) - 7:55 
 "Dark Victory" (Charlie Haden) - 4:19 
 "Latin Genetics" (Ornette Coleman) - 7:49 
 "This Is the Hour" (Paul Motian) - 6:09 
 "Insanity" - 4:14 
 "New Flame" (Haden) - 9:45 
 "Sting a Ring" (Motian) - 7:07 
 "Blues for Josh" (Haden) - 5:27 
 "Enough Is Enough" (Motian) - 8:14
Recorded at Mondial Sound in Milano, Italy on July 20, 1990.

Personnel
 Paul Bley — piano 
Charlie Haden — bass
 Paul Motian — drums

References

Black Saint/Soul Note albums
Paul Bley albums
Charlie Haden albums
Paul Motian albums
1990 albums